The 1897 Detroit College Tigers football team  was an American football team that represented Detroit College (renamed the University of Detroit in 1911) as an independent during the 1897 college football season. In its second season under head coach William S. Robinson, the team compiled a 1–2 record and was outscored by opponents by a combined total of 36 to 28.  The team played one game against the Michigan Military Academy (a 26–24 loss) and two games against Detroit High School (one win and one loss). The result of the loss was disputed due to the fact that the high school game had two players who were not students.

Schedule

References

Detroit College Tigers
Detroit Titans football seasons
Detroit College Tigers football
Detroit College Tigers football